That's Manchester is a local television station serving Greater Manchester. It is owned and operated by That's TV and broadcasts on Freeview channel 7 from studios at The Flint Glass Works in the Ancoats suburb of Manchester.

Overview
Before the launch of That's Manchester, Channel M had broadcast a locally focused television service for Greater Manchester from February 2000 until April 2012, when the service was deemed unviable to continue by its owners.

In 2013, as part of a national roll-out of local television in the United Kingdom, the broadcast regulator Ofcom awarded the licence to Your TV Manchester, but the channel failed to launch within the two year time frame as stipulated by Ofcom. The company, which also won a licence to service the Preston and Blackpool areas, had beaten four other bids - Made in Manchester, Manchester News Channel, MCR TV and Metro8 Manchester.

That's TV subsequently took over the licence, and in May 2015, Ofcom granted That's Manchester a ten-and-a-half year licence to provide a local television service. A soft launch of the channel took place at 9pm on Sunday 31 May 2015.

In March 2016, the station was placed on notice by Ofcom over persistent technical issues in its programming, along with its sister stations, That's Oxfordshire and That's Solent.

The station broadcasts to its licence area from the Winter Hill transmitter via a directional localised signal beam on Freeview channel 7, but is not available on satellite or cable.

Programming
Along with all of the That's TV stations, That's Manchester programming consisted of a single news bulletin, shown on a loop during the evening and overnight, with teleshopping and old films broadcast during the day. However, after their deal with classic movie provider Timeless  expired, That's TV started to simulcast various TV shopping and reality TV shows on their channels before bringing in more music programming in the evening.

By 2020 That's Manchester had become reduced to a 10-minute local news slot at 6pm, with music video shows networked under the 'That's 70s', 'That's 80s' and 'That's 90s' section name in the afternoon and night (TJC - The Jewellery Channel was still being simulcast in the morning). In November 2020, the newly rebranded That's Christmas started broadcasting the "Retro Disco Christmas Party" in its music video slot, with a mixture of Christmas classics and 'Europop/Party Tunes' from the 70s, 80s and 90s being played back-to-back The channel then became That's New Year, before reverting to separate blocks of That's 70s, That's 80s and That's 90s music video selections in 2021 (with the teleshopping continuing as well)

On January 5, 2021, rival operator Local Television Limited (LOCAL TV) launched a second local channel for Mancunians on the GImux multiplex (G-MAN). Called Manchester TV, the service on channel 99 debuted LOCAL TV's new 'L7' branding and had a schedule similar to other channels in the LOCAL TV portfolio with a mixture of CBS Reality programmes and news from across the UK (though Manchester-specific news content is due to follow).

As of October 2021, the channel is simulcasting the That's TV Gold schedule with opt-outs for the short evening news bulletin each weekday night and a rolling news service at 3am replacing the usual late night music video slot (for example That's Classic Rock at the weekends). On 9 October 2021, That's TV Manchester started to replace their Gold channel's That's 70s - The Best Music programme at the weekend with the Manchester Music Marathon, a local music slot at 6pm, going out between back-to-back repeats of The Kenny Everett Video Show's first two series, on its first showing.

Previous programming
Apart from the station's main news programme, Manchester Headline News, programming included current affairs programmes Now We're Talking, Advice Show and The Big Debate, offbeat news show Student Speak, arts and culture show That's Chatty, and specialist shows such as That's Pride and The Geek Show. These programmes were dropped in 2017.

See also
 List of television stations in the United Kingdom
 Local television in the United Kingdom

References

2015 establishments in England
Local television channels in the United Kingdom
Mass media in Manchester
Television channels and stations established in 2015